11A may refer to:

 Freon 11A or trichlorofluoromethane
 New Hampshire Route 11A
 New York State Route 11A
 TG-11A or Stemme S10, a German glider
 Clayton Municipal Airport (Alabama)'s FAA LID
 The anticlockwise bus service on West Midlands bus route 11
 802.11a, an amendment to the IEEE 802.11 wireless local network specifications

See also
 Stalag XI-A, a German Army World War II prisoner-of-war camp near Altengrabow
 A11 (disambiguation)